Igor Łasicki (born 26 June 1995) is a Polish professional footballer who plays as a centre-back for I liga club Wisła Kraków.

Club career 
Łasicki is a youth product of Zagłębie Lubin. In 2012, he joined Napoli, initially playing for their Primavera squad. On 18 May 2014 he made his first-team debut, coming on as a substitute for Jorginho against Hellas Verona.

On 19 July 2014, he was loaned Serie C club Gubbio for the season.

On 7 July 2017 he was loaned to Ekstraklasa club Wisła Płock.

References

External links 
 
 

Polish footballers
People from Wałbrzych
Polish expatriate footballers
1995 births
Living people
S.S.C. Napoli players
A.S. Gubbio 1910 players
A.C. Carpi players
Wisła Płock players
Pogoń Szczecin players
Wisła Kraków players
Serie A players
Serie B players
Serie C players
Ekstraklasa players
III liga players
Poland youth international footballers
Association football midfielders
Expatriate footballers in Italy
Polish expatriate sportspeople in Italy
S.S. Maceratese 1922 players
Poland under-21 international footballers